Eupithecia usta is a moth in the family Geometridae. It is found in Chile.

The length of the forewings is about 12 mm for females. The forewings are reddish brown at the base of the wing and pale grey on the remainder. The hindwings are pale greyish white, with slender brown and blackish brown cross lines.

References

Moths described in 1882
usta
Moths of South America
Endemic fauna of Chile